Fellows of the Royal Society elected in 1898.

Fellows

 Henry Frederick Baker (1866–1956)
 Ernest William Brown (1866–1938)
 Alexander Buchan (1829–1907)
 George Nathaniel Curzon (1859–1925)
 Sidney Frederic Harmer (1862–1950)
 Nathaniel Lindley (1828–1921)
 Arthur Lister (1830–1908)
 Sir Herbert Eustace Maxwell (1845–1937)
 Charles Alexander McMahon (1830–1904)
 William Osler (1849–1919)
 Charles Algernon Parsons (1854–1931)
 Thomas Preston (1860–1900)
 Edward Waymouth Reid (1862–1948)
 Alexander Scott (1853–1947)
 Albert Seward (1863–1941)
 William Ashwell Shenstone (1850–1908)
 Henry Martyn Taylor (1842–1927)
 James Wimshurst (1832–1903)

References

1898 in science
1898
1898 in the United Kingdom